The Trumpeter's Well at Caldermill in South Lanarkshire is recorded as the site of the death of a government trumpeter or cornet who was killed in the aftermath of the 1679 Battle of Drumclog at which the Covenanters were victorious.

Introduction 
The Category C Listed Trumpeter's Well is located in the hamlet of Caldermill (NS 66013 41683) in a field beside the entrance drive to Hillhead Farm, on the A71 route to Strathaven from Darvel, Parish of Avondale, South Lanarkshire. The site lies about 3 miles away from the site of the Battle of Drumclog.

Description 

In 1858 the Trumpeter's Well had been infilled, but was traditionally associated with the death of a trumpeter whose burial site was still pointed out. The well head is stone lined and protected by a professionally built 9' high circular stone rubble building with a concical slated roof and a wooden door with an ashlar surround, once again in use in 1966, the water from it supplying nearby Hillhead Farm. The building probably dates from the early 19th century. 

In 1851 - 1861 the spot where he was buried was still known locally, but there was no appearance of a grave. Lidar images do however show depressions in the field lying close to the well house.

History 

During the covenanting period there was a battle in 1679 near the village of Drumclog following an illegal religious meeting known as a Conventicle that was held in this isolated moorland site. Graham of Claverhouse, later Viscount Dundee, was the leader of the government troops and during the this Battle of Drumclog, Thomas Finlay, a farmer who had attended the meeting, stabbed Claverhouse's horse with his pike, severely injuring it. 'Bloody Clavers' as the Covenanter's called him, was able to force his mount on until he encountered his trumpeter and took this boy's horse from him to secure his own escape. 

This trumpeter is said to have been a boy of around 14 years of age who was subsequently caught at Caldermill, killed by the covenanters and his body was thrown into the well that lay close to the road. Subsequently it seems to have been removed and buried nearby.

Some reports indicate that other government dragoons attempting to escape the battle ground, were also killed nearby and buried here, possibly in a mass grave.

The OS Name Book gives a twist on the story stating that in 1851 - 1861 tradition stated that the Trumpeter was killed here while his horse was drinking at the well. At the time of the OS visit Hillhead Farm was owned and occupied by Joseph Allison.

A further element of confusion is that the cornet to Claverhouse was in common parlance a 'trumpeter' and is said to have been killed in the battle:

"The Rebels upon Captain Graham's Approach, sent out Two Parties to skirmish with him, which he beat into their main Body. Then they advanced with their whole Force upon him, who after a considerable Slaughter of the Rebels, and the Loss of his Cornet, Two Brigadiers, about Eight Horse, and Twenty Dragoons, (his own Horse being killed under him, and mounting another)...." 

Scotlands Places records details given by Sheriff Aiton of a skirmish at a dwelling, now demolished, known as Capernaum near Drumclog Bridge:

"The Covenanters pursued the Troops to Calder Water about 3 miles from the field of Action. A person of the name Findlay from Lesmahagow armed with a pitchfork came up with Captain Graham at a place called "Capernaum" near Coldwakening and would probably have killed that officer had not another of the Covenanters called to Findlay to strike at the Horse and thereby secure both it and the rider. The blow intended for the Captain was spent upon his mare and the Captain escaped by mounting with great agility the horse of his trumpeter who was killed by the Whigs"

See also
Lady's Well, Auchmannoch

References

Notes

Sources and further reading
 Aiton, W. (1821). A history of the rencounter at Drumclog, and battle at Bothwell Bridge. 

 Black, C.S. (1936). "Scottish battles". Glasgow: Brown Son & Ferguson.

 Brander, M. (1993). "Scottish and Border Battles and Ballads". New York: Barnes & Noble Books.

 Brotchie, T. C. F. (1913) "The battlefields of Scotland : their legend and story". New York: Dodge Publishing.

 Campbell, J. Ramsey (1943), "My Ain, My Native Tour – Stra’ven", Strathaven: J.M.Bryson.

 Campbell, T. (1996). "Standing witnesses : a guide to the Scottish Covenanters and their memorials, with a historical introduction. Edinburgh: Saltire Society". 

 Clark, D. (1996). "Battlefield walks : Scotland. Stroud: Sutton Publishing". 

 Hamilton, J. (2004). "Scottish Battles". New Lanark: Geddes & Grosset.

 Hearne, R. (1681). "Loyalties severe summons to the bar of conscience, or, A seasonable and timely call to the people of England, upon the present juncture of affairs being an epitome of the several praeliminaries or gradual steps the late times took to their ... ruine, by their civil dissentions, through a needless fear of the subverting, losing, and destroying of religion, liberty of the subject, and priviledges of Parliament". London: Printed by Thomas Milbourn and sold by Randal Taylor.

 MacMeeken, J. W. and Church Reformed Presbyterian. (1849). "A tribute to the memory of our Scottish martyrs : their privileges, their sufferings and faithfulness and our duty in reference to their example ; a sermon preached on the battle-field of Drumclog, on Sabbath, 24th June, 1849". Glasgow: John Keith & Son.

 Scott, W. (1871). "Old mortality, Waverley novels; Vol. 5". Edinburgh: Adam & Charles Black.

 Whyte, I. and K. Whyte. (1990). "On the Trail of the Jacobites". London: Routledge. 

 Wilson, W. (1751). "The true and impartial relation of the persecuted Presbyterians in Scotland; their rising in arms, and defeat at Bothwell-Bridge, in the year 1679". Glasgow.

External links
YouTube video history of the Trumpeter's Well
 A Researcher's Guide to Local History terminology

Religion in Scotland
Springs of Scotland
Landforms of South Lanarkshire
Villages in South Lanarkshire
Buildings and structures in South Lanarkshire